Mark Huizinga (born 10 September 1973) is a Dutch judoka and Olympic champion.

Huizinga was born in Vlaardingen, South Holland in Netherlands in 1973. He won the gold medal in the men's under 90 kg class at the 2000 Summer Olympics by defeating Brazil's Carlos Honorato by ippon. He took bronze at the 1996 and 2004 Summer Olympics. Other laurels include five European Championships and a bronze medal at the 2005 World Judo Championships. Huizinga retired after the 2008 Olympics.

Trivia
On 20 January 2010, Huizinga participated in De Nationale IQ test (The National IQ test) of Dutch broadcaster BNN, an informal quiz/comedy show. He was rated with an intelligence quotient of 142, an all-time record on the show.

References

External links

 
 
 
 
 

1973 births
Living people
Dutch male judoka
Olympic judoka of the Netherlands
Judoka at the 1996 Summer Olympics
Judoka at the 2000 Summer Olympics
Judoka at the 2004 Summer Olympics
Judoka at the 2008 Summer Olympics
Olympic gold medalists for the Netherlands
Olympic bronze medalists for the Netherlands
People from Vlaardingen
Olympic medalists in judo
Medalists at the 1996 Summer Olympics
Medalists at the 2000 Summer Olympics
Medalists at the 2004 Summer Olympics
Sportspeople from South Holland
20th-century Dutch people
21st-century Dutch people